Damian Wroblewski (born May 4, 1976) is an American football coach and former center, who is the current offensive line and assistant head coach of the James Madison Dukes. He played college football at Lafayette for coach Bill Russo from 1996 to 1999.

Coaching career
Wroblewski head assistant coaching positions at Bryant, Penn, Hofstra and Stony Brook. Wroblewski served as assistant head coach and offensive line coach of the Delaware Blue Hens football team from 2007 to 2011. He was the offensive line coach formerly for the Rutgers University football team. and served as the offensive line coach and assistant head coach of the Elon University football team.

References

1976 births
Living people
Delaware Fightin' Blue Hens football coaches
Rutgers Scarlet Knights football coaches
Elon Phoenix football coaches
Lafayette Leopards football players